Imre Bodó (born 8 May 1962) is a Hungarian politician, member of the National Assembly (MP) from Csongrád County Regional List from 2007 to 2010. He represented Szeged (Constituency I) between 14 May 2010 and 5 May 2014. He was a member of the Committee on Agriculture between 2007 and 2010 and Committee on Sustainable Development from 2010 to 2012.

He served as the Mayor of Tiszasziget from 1998 to 2014.

Personal life
He is married and has two children.

References

1962 births
Living people
Fidesz politicians
Members of the National Assembly of Hungary (2006–2010)
Members of the National Assembly of Hungary (2010–2014)
Mayors of places in Hungary
People from Szeged